Cristian Fernández Parentini (born 15 July 1979 in Buenos Aires, Argentina) is an Argentine footballer.

Honours

Huracán

Primera B Nacional Argentina: 1 (2000)

External links
 BDFA profile

1979 births
Living people
Footballers from Buenos Aires
Argentine footballers
Argentine expatriate footballers
Argentine Primera División players
Serie B players
Segunda División B players
Bolivian Primera División players
Club Atlético Huracán footballers
Venezia F.C. players
Racing Club de Avellaneda footballers
UE Lleida players
Audax Italiano footballers
Spezia Calcio players
Club Aurora players
Expatriate footballers in Chile
Expatriate footballers in Bolivia
Expatriate footballers in Italy
Expatriate footballers in Spain
Argentine expatriate sportspeople in Chile
Argentine expatriate sportspeople in Bolivia
Argentine expatriate sportspeople in Italy
Argentine expatriate sportspeople in Spain
Association football defenders